We Are Here may refer to:
 We Are Here (collective), an Amsterdam-based group of migrants campaigning for improved treatment
 We Are Here (Apparatjik album) (2010)
 We Are Here (Flower Travellin' Band album) (2008)
 "We Are Here" (Alicia Keys song) (2014)
 We Are Here Movement, a non-profit organization created by Alicia Keys
 We Are Here, a 2017 short film written by Troian Bellisario

See also
 Here We Are (disambiguation)
 We're Here, a 2020 reality TV series on HBO